Dorota Masłowska (Polish pronunciation:; born 3 July 1983) is a Polish writer, playwright, columnist and journalist. She is the winner of the 2006 Nike Award, Poland's most important literary prize, for her novel The Queen's Peacock.

Life and work

Masłowska was born in Wejherowo, and grew up there. She applied for the University of Gdańsk's faculty of psychology and was accepted, but left the studies for Warsaw, where she joined the culture studies at the Warsaw University. She first appeared in the mass-media when her debut book Wojna polsko-ruska pod flagą biało-czerwoną (translated to English as either White and Red in the UK or Snow White and Russian Red in the US; literally means Polish-Russian War under White-Red Flag) was published. Largely controversial, mostly because of the language seen by many as vulgar, cynical and simple, the book was praised by many intellectuals as innovative and fresh. Among the most active supporters of Masłowska were Marcin Świetlicki and Polityka weekly staff, most notably renowned writer Jerzy Pilch. A notable example of post-modernist literature, her book became a best-seller in Poland and won Masłowska several notable awards as well as general support among the critics. It was almost immediately translated onto several languages, including French, German, Spanish, Italian, Dutch, Russian, English, Hungarian, Czech and Lithuanian, and won the Deutscher Jugendliteraturpreis.

Her second novel Paw królowej (The Queen's Peacock) did not gain similar popularity, even though it won the NIKE Literary Award in 2006. As of 2009, Dorota Masłowska's permanent residence is in Kraków. In 2009, she resided in Berlin on a German Academic Exchange Service stipend. She has collaborated with a number of magazines, most notably the Przekrój and Wysokie Obcasy weeklies, as well as Lampa monthly and the quarterly B EAT magazine.

Her first play, Dwoje biednych Rumunów mówiących po polsku (A Couple of Poor, Polish-Speaking Romanians), has been translated by Lisa Goldman and Paul Sirett and was performed for the first time in the UK at Soho Theatre from 28 February – 29 March 2008 with a cast featuring Andrew Tiernan, Andrea Riseborough, Howard Ward, Valerie Lilley, Ishia Bennison, John Rogan and Jason Cheater. Neither Goldman nor Sirett know Polish and based their adaptation on a technical translation and a line by line translation with Dorota Maslowska in London in 2007. An American translation of the play by Benjamin Paloff was commissioned by TR Warszawa in 2007 and has been performed in New York. Dorota Maslowska October 2015 she was awarded the Bronze Medal for Merit to Culture – Gloria Artis.

Works
2002: Wojna polsko-ruska pod flagą biało-czerwoną. Warsaw: Lampa i Iskra Boża,  (UK edition: White and Red, Atlantic Books, ; US edition: Snow White and Russian Red, Grove Press)
2005: Paw królowej. Warsaw: Lampa i Iskra Boża,  (no English translation announced yet)
2006: Dwoje biednych Rumunów mówiących po polsku. Warsaw: Lampa i Iskra Boża, . Translated into English as A Couple of Poor, Polish-Speaking Romanians, by Lisa Goldman and Paul Sirett, Oberon Books Ltd (29 Feb 2008), . Staged at Soho Theatre, London, between 28 February – 29 March 2008. 
2008: Między nami dobrze jest, drama
2010: Schneeweiß und Russenrot, drama
2012: Kochanie, zabiłam nasze koty ("Honey, I Killed Our Cats"), novel
2018: Inni ludzie, novel

References

External links
The sweet taste of underground – Essay on Maslowska's second book, a rap poem, by German journalist Ina Hartwig at signandsight.com
I Was a Teenage Polish Existentialist – Essay on Maslowska's first novel by Wolfie Darling.
Dorota Masłowska at culture.pl

Living people
People from Wejherowo
21st-century Polish novelists
Nike Award winners
Polish women novelists
21st-century Polish women writers
Recipients of the Bronze Medal for Merit to Culture – Gloria Artis
1983 births